Cofidis Women Team is a professional road bicycle racing women's team which participates in elite women's races. The title sponsor is the French money lending company Cofidis.

Team roster

Major results
2022
Stage 4 Bretagne Ladies Tour, Martina Alzini
Strijpen road race, Alana Castrique

World champions
 World Track (Team pursuit), Martina Alzini

References

External links

UCI Women's Teams
Cycling teams based in France
Cycling teams established in 2022